Warren Wolf may refer to:

 Warren Wolf (American football) (1927–2019), American high school football head coach and politician
 Warren Wolf (musician) (born 1979), American jazz vibraphonist